Armin Bittner (born November 28, 1964) is a German former alpine skier.

In the Alberto Tomba era, Bittner was a difficult opponent for the Italian and beat him twice in slalom – in 1989 and 1990.

Career
He won a total of 7 Alpine Skiing World Cup races, all in Slalom. He competed in the 1988, 1992, and 1994 Winter Olympic Games, but did not win any medals.

World Cup victories

World Cups

Individual races

References

External links
 
 

1964 births
Living people
Sportspeople from Garmisch-Partenkirchen
German male alpine skiers
FIS Alpine Ski World Cup champions
Olympic alpine skiers of Germany
Olympic alpine skiers of West Germany
Alpine skiers at the 1988 Winter Olympics
Alpine skiers at the 1992 Winter Olympics
Alpine skiers at the 1994 Winter Olympics
20th-century German people